is a passenger railway station located in the city of Himeji, Hyōgo Prefecture, Japan, operated by the private Sanyo Electric Railway.

Lines

Station layout
The station consists of two unnumbered ground-level side platforms connected by a level crossing. The station is unattended.

Platforms

Adjacent stations

|-
!colspan=5|Sanyo Electric Railway

History
It was renamed  on 1 April 1944 and renamed its present name on 7 April 1991.

Passenger statistics
In fiscal 2018, the station was used by an average of 1276 passengers daily (boarding passengers only).

Surrounding area
 Kameyama Hontokuji Temple (Kameyama Gobo) 
 Japan National Route 2 
 Himeji Central Hospital

See also
List of railway stations in Japan

References

External links

 Official website (Sanyo Electric Railway) 

Railway stations in Japan opened in 1923
Railway stations in Himeji